Calicovatellus is an extinct genus of dytiscid beetle in the subfamily Hydroporinae. , one species is recognized, Calicovatellus petrodytes. It was found in the Barstow Formation in southern California and dates to the Miocene.

References

Dytiscidae genera
Monotypic Adephaga genera
Prehistoric beetle genera